Pierwsze wyjście z mroku (First Emergence from Darkness) is a debut album by the Polish rock band Coma, released on May 17, 2004.

The album consists of both ballad-like tracks ("Leszek Żukowski", "Pasażer", "100 tysięcy jednakowych miast") and harder songs (e.g. "Czas globalnej niepogody", "Zbyszek").

In 2005 the album was granted polish music award Fryderyk in Rock category.

Track listing

Charts

References

External links
English lyrics translations
http://coma.art.pl/plyta/pierwsze-wyjscie-z-mroku/leszek/?en
http://coma.art.pl/plyta/pierwsze-wyjscie-z-mroku/sierpien/?en
http://coma.art.pl/plyta/pierwsze-wyjscie-z-mroku/chaos-kontrolowany/?en
http://coma.art.pl/plyta/pierwsze-wyjscie-z-mroku/pierwsze-wyjscie-z-mroku/?en
http://coma.art.pl/plyta/pierwsze-wyjscie-z-mroku/pasazer/?en
http://coma.art.pl/plyta/pierwsze-wyjscie-z-mroku/ocalenie/?en
http://coma.art.pl/plyta/pierwsze-wyjscie-z-mroku/spadam/?en
http://coma.art.pl/plyta/pierwsze-wyjscie-z-mroku/czas-globalnej-niepogody/?en
http://coma.art.pl/plyta/pierwsze-wyjscie-z-mroku/nie-wierze-skurwysynom/?en
http://coma.art.pl/plyta/pierwsze-wyjscie-z-mroku/sto-tysiecy-jednakowych-miast/?en
http://coma.art.pl/plyta/pierwsze-wyjscie-z-mroku/zbyszek/?en

2004 debut albums
Coma (band) albums